Sylhet Govt. Women's Collegeis an academy located in Sylhet, Bangladesh. It was established in 1939 and makes important contributions in field of women's studies in Bangladesh.  Many alumni are now working at high levels in government and private institutions.

The college currently provided higher education in science and the arts. Since the 2009–2010 academic year it was provided English lessons as well. The principal is Md. Hayatul Islam Akanjee and the vice principal is Fahima Zinnurayen. As of 2013 there are 5013 students enrolled. The relevant Board of Education in the Sylhet Education Board. They are affiliated with Bangladesh National University.

There are three buildings situated in college area, the Arts Building, the Academic Building, and the Science Building. There also two women's hostels for students who live far away from the college.

Campus
The college has 4 acres of land of its own. There are 3 academic buildings consisting of 3 floors, 1 modern auditorium with 600 seating capacity and an administrative building.  A rich library is situated at the arts building. The residential arrangement of the students includes 5 buildings with 360 accommodation but more than 500 students reside at the hall. Principal's bungalow and hall superintendent's quarters are within the campus. This college has a commercial building with 16 shops including a commercial bank from which government earns a handsome amount of rent.

In 2011, the college had the third best results in the Sylhet Division under the Board of Intermediate and Secondary Education, Sylhet.

Faculties and departments

Faculty of Arts

 Department of Bengali
 Department of English
 Department of Islamic History and Culture
 Department of Philosophy
 Department of History

Faculty of Social Science

 Department of Economics
 Department of Political Science
 Department of Social Welfare
 Department of Home Economics

Faculty of Science
 Department of Physics
 Department of Chemistry
 Department of Mathematics
 Department of Botany
 Department of Zoology

Notable alumni
 Hosne Ara Wahid, teacher, NGO manager, and politician 
 Fatema Chowdhury Paru, politician

References

External links

Colleges in Sylhet District
Universities and colleges in Sylhet District
Women's universities and colleges in Bangladesh
Education in Sylhet
Educational institutions established in 1939
1939 establishments in India